Gymnallabes nops, popularly known as the blind eel catfish, is a species of airbreathing catfish found in the lower Congo River basin in the countries of the Democratic Republic of the Congo and the Republic of the Congo.  It is blind, non-pigmented and grows to a length of  SL.

References 

Clariidae
Fish of Africa
Taxa named by Tyson R. Roberts
Fish described in 1976